A Consolidated Fund Act is an Act of the Parliament of the United Kingdom passed to allow, like an Appropriation Act, the Treasury to issue funds out of the Consolidated Fund.

The typical structure of such an Act begins with the long title, which defines which financial years the Act applies to. This is followed by a preamble and then the enacting clause:

Until 2000 an older form of preamble was used:

If, as most of the Acts do, the legislation covers two fiscal years the legislation's first two sections will contain the amounts to be paid out of the Consolidated Fund for each particular financial year. The third section of the Act defines its short title. Typically two or three consolidated fund Acts are passed each calendar year.

A Consolidated Fund Act normally becomes spent on the conclusion of the financial year to which it relates. However, the Consolidated Fund Act 1816 is still in force, since it combined the consolidated funds of Great Britain and Ireland into one consolidated fund of the United Kingdom.

List

1816
The Consolidated Fund Act 1816 (56 Geo 3 c 98).

1859
The Consolidated Fund (£1,222,383 8s. 9d.) Act (22 Vict c 6). The Bill for this Act was the Consolidated Fund (£1,222,383 8s. 9d.) Bill. This Act received royal assent on 25 March 1859.
The Consolidated Fund (£11,000,000) Act (22 Vict c 7). The Bill for this Act was the Consolidated Fund (£11,000,000) Bill. This Act received royal assent on 25 March 1859.
The Consolidated Fund (£7,000,000) Act (22 & 23 Vict c 2). The Bill for this Act was the Consolidated Fund (£7,000,000) Bill. This Act received royal assent on 1 August 1859.

1860
The Consolidated Fund (£407,649) Act (23 & 24 Vict c 2) is sometimes called the Supply Act 1860. The Bill for this Act was the Consolidated Fund (£407,649) Bill. This Act received royal assent on 12 March 1860, and was repealed by the Statute Law Revision Act 1875.
The Consolidated Fund (£4,500,000) Act (23 & 24 Vict c 3) is sometimes called the Supply Act 1860. The Bill for this Act was the Consolidated Fund (£4,500,000) Bill. This Act received royal assent on 23 March 1860, and was repealed by the Statute Law Revision Act 1875.
The Consolidated Fund (£850,000) Act (23 & 24 Vict c 12). The Bill for this Act was the Consolidated Fund (£850,000) Bill. This Act received royal assent on 31 March 1860, and was repealed by the Statute Law Revision Act 1875.
The Consolidated Fund (£9,500,000) Act (23 & 24 Vict c 25). The Bill for this Act was the Consolidated Fund (£9,500,000) Bill. This Act received royal assent on 25 May 1860, and was repealed by the Statute Law Revision Act 1875.
The Consolidated Fund (£10,000,000) Act (23 & 24 Vict c 103) is sometimes called the Supply Act 1860. The Bill for this Act was the Consolidated Fund (£10,000,000) Bill. This Act received royal assent on 20 August 1860, and was repealed by the Statute Law Revision Act 1875.

1861
The Consolidated Fund (4,000,000) Act (24 & 25 Vict c 2) is sometimes called the Supply Act 1861. The Bill for this Act was the Consolidated Fund (£4,000,000) Bill. This Act received royal assent on 22 March 1861, and was repealed by the Statute Law Revision Act 1875.
The Consolidated Fund (3,000,000) Act (24 & 25 Vict c 6) is sometimes called the Supply Act 1861. The Bill for this Act was the Consolidated Fund (£3,000,000) Bill. This Act received royal assent on 18 April 1861, and was repealed by the Statute Law Revision Act 1875.
The Consolidated Fund (10,000,000) Act (24 & 25 Vict c 19) is sometimes called the Supply Act 1861. The Bill for this Act was the Consolidated Fund (£10,000,000) Bill. This Act received royal assent on 7 June 1861, and was repealed by the Statute Law Revision Act 1875.

1862
The Consolidated Fund (£973,747) Act (25 & 26 Vict c 1) is sometimes called the Supply Act 1862. The Bill for this Act was the Consolidated Fund (£973,747) Bill. This Act received royal assent on 10 March 1862, and was repealed by the Statute Law Revision Act 1875.
The Consolidated Fund (£18,000,000) Act (25 & 26 Vict c 2). The Bill for this Act was the Consolidated Fund (£18,000,000) Bill. This Act received royal assent on 24 March 1862, and was repealed by the Statute Law Revision Act 1875.
The Consolidated Fund (£10,000,000) Act (25 & 26 Vict c 31) is sometimes called the Supply Act 1862. The Bill for this Act was the Consolidated Fund (£10,000,000) Bill. This Act received royal assent on 7 July 1862, and was repealed by the Statute Law Revision Act 1875.

1863
The Consolidated Fund (£10,000,000) Act (26 & 27 Vict c 6) is sometimes called the Supply Act 1863. The Bill for this Act was the Consolidated Fund (£10,000,000) Bill. This Act received royal assent on 27 March 1863, and was repealed by the Statute Law Revision Act 1875.
The Consolidated Fund (£20,000,000) Act (26 & 27 Vict c 15) is sometimes called the Supply Act 1863. The Bill for this Act was the Consolidated Fund (£20,000,000) Bill. This Act received royal assent on 11 May 1863, and was repealed by the Statute Law Revision Act 1875.

1864
The Consolidated Fund (£584,650) Act (27 & 28 Vict c 5) is sometimes called the Supply Act 1864. The Bill for this Act was the Consolidated Fund (£584,650) Bill. This Act received royal assent on 18 March 1864, and was repealed by the Statute Law Revision Act 1875.
The Consolidated Fund (£4,500,000) Act (27 & 28 Vict c 6) is sometimes called the Supply Act 1864. The Bill for this Act was the Consolidated Fund (4,500,000) Bill. This Act received royal assent on 18 March 1864, and was repealed by the Statute Law Revision Act 1875.
The Consolidated Fund (£15,000,000) Act (27 & 28 Vict c 11) is sometimes called the Supply Act 1864. The Bill for this Act was the Consolidated Fund (£15,000,000) Bill. This Act received royal assent on 28 April 1864, and was repealed by the Statute Law Revision Act 1875.

1865
The Consolidated Fund (£175,650) Act (28 & 29 Vict c 4) is sometimes called the Supply Act 1865. The Bill for this Act was the Consolidated Fund (£175,650) Bill. This Act received royal assent on 27 March 1865, and was repealed by the Statute Law Revision Act 1875.
The Consolidated Fund (£15,000,000) Act (28 & 29 Vict c 10) is sometimes called the Supply Act 1865. The Bill for this Act was the Consolidated Fund (£15,000,000) Bill. This Act received royal assent on 7 April 1865, and was repealed by the Statute Law Revision Act 1875.

1866
The Act 29 & 30 Vict c 6. The Bill for this Act was the Consolidated Fund (£1,137,772) Bill. This Act received royal assent on 13 March 1866, and was repealed by the Statute Law Revision Act 1875.
The Consolidated Fund Act (19,000,000l.) (29 & 30 Vict c 13). The Bill for this Act was the Consolidated Fund (£19,000,000) Bill. This Act received royal assent on 23 March 1866, and was repealed by the Statute Law Revision Act 1875.

1867
The Consolidated Fund (£369,118 5s. 6d.) Act (30 & 31 Vict c 4) is sometimes called the Supply Act 1867. The Bill for this Act was the Consolidated Fund (£369,118 5s. 6d.) Bill. This Act received royal assent on 29 March 1867, and was repealed by the Statute Law Revision Act 1875.
The Consolidated Fund (£7,924,000) Act (30 & 31 Vict c 7) is sometimes called the Supply Act 1867. The Bill for this Act was the Consolidated Fund (£7,924,000) Bill. This Act received royal assent on 5 April 1867, and was repealed by the Statute Law Revision Act 1875.
The Consolidated Fund (£14,000,000) Act (30 & 31 Vict c 30). The Bill for this Act was the Consolidated Fund (£14,000,000) Bill. This Act received royal assent on 17 June 1867, and was repealed by the Statute Law Revision Act 1875.
The Consolidated Fund (£2,000,000) Act (31 & 32 Vict c 1) is sometimes called the Supply Act 1867. The Bill for this Act was the Consolidated Fund (£2,000,000) Bill. This Act received royal assent on 7 December 1867, and was repealed by the Statute Law Revision Act 1875.

1868
The Consolidated Fund (£362,398 19s. 9d.) Act (31 & 32 Vict c 10) is sometimes called the Supply Act 1868. The Bill for this Act was the Consolidated Fund (£362,398 19s. 9d.) Bill. This Act received royal assent on 30 March 1868, and was repealed by the Statute Law Revision Act 1875.
The Consolidated Fund (£6,000,000) Act (31 & 32 Vict c 13) is sometimes called the Supply Act 1868. The Bill for this Act was the Consolidated Fund (£6,000,000) Bill. This Act received royal assent on 3 April 1868, and was repealed by the Statute Law Revision Act 1875.
The Consolidated Fund (£17,000,000) Act (31 & 32 Vict c 16). The Bill for this Act was the Consolidated Fund (£17,000,000) Bill. This Act received royal assent on 29 May 1868, and was repealed by the Statute Law Revision Act 1875.

1869
The Consolidated Fund (8,406,272l. 13s. 4d.) Act (32 & 33 Vict c 1) is sometimes called the Supply Act 1869. The Bill for this Act was the Consolidated Fund (£8,406,272 13s. 4d.) Bill. This Act received royal assent on 19 March 1869, and was repealed by the Statute Law Revision Act 1883.
The Consolidated Fund (£17,100,000) Act (32 & 33 Vict c 8). The Bill for this Act was the Consolidated Fund (£17,100,000) Bill. This Act received royal assent on 13 May 1869, and was repealed by the Statute Law Revision Act 1883.

1870
The Consolidated Fund (£9,564,191 7s. 2d.) Act (33 & 34 Vict c 5) is sometimes called the Supply Act 1870. The Bill for this Act was the Consolidated Fund (£9,564,191 7s. 2d.) Bill. This Act received royal assent on 25 March 1870, and was repealed by the Statute Law Revision Act 1883.
The Consolidated Fund (£9,000,000) Act (33 & 34 Vict c 31). The Bill for this Act was the Consolidated Fund (£9,000,000) Bill. This Act received royal assent on 1 August 1870, and was repealed by the Statute Law Revision Act 1883.

1871
The Consolidated Fund (£462,580 9s. 11d.) Act (34 & 35 Vict c 6) is sometimes called the Supply Act 1871. The Bill for this Act was the Consolidated Fund (£462,580 9s. 11d.) Bill. This Act received royal assent on 30 March 1871, and was repealed by the Statute Law Revision Act 1883.
The Consolidated Fund (£5,411,900) Act (34 & 35 Vict c 7) is sometimes called the Supply Act 1871. The Bill for this Act was the Consolidated Fund (£5,411,900) Bill. This Act received royal assent on 31 March 1871, and was repealed by the Statute Law Revision Act 1883.
The Consolidated Fund (£7,000,000) Act (34 & 35 Vict c 20) is sometimes called the Supply Act 1871. The Bill for this Act was the Consolidated Fund (£7,000,000) Bill. This Act received royal assent on 25 May 1871, and was repealed by the Statute Law Revision Act 1883.
The Consolidated Fund (£10,000,000) Act (34 & 35 Vict c 51) is sometimes called the Supply Act 1871. The Bill for this Act was the Consolidated Fund (£10,000,000) Bill. This Act received royal assent on 24 July 1871, and was repealed by the Statute Law Revision Act 1883.

1872
The Act 35 & 36 Vict c 1. The Bill for this Act was the Consolidated Fund (£5,411,099 3s. 3d.) Bill. This Act received royal assent on 25 March 1872, and was repealed by the Statute Law Revision Act 1883.
The Act 35 & 36 Vict c 11. The Bill for this Act was the Consolidated Fund (£6,000,000) Bill. This Act received royal assent on 13 May 1872, and was repealed by the Statute Law Revision Act 1883.
The Act 35 & 36 Vict c 37. The Bill for this Act was the Consolidated Fund (£8,000,000) Bill. This Act received royal assent on 25 July 1872, and was repealed by the Statute Law Revision Act 1883.

1873
The Act 36 & 37 Vict c 3. The Bill for this Act was the Consolidated Fund (£9,317,346 19s. 9d.) Bill. This Act received royal assent on 29 March 1873, and was repealed by the Statute Law Revision Act 1883.
The Act 36 & 37 Vict c 26. The Bill for this Act was the Consolidated Fund (£12,000,000) Bill. This Act received royal assent on 16 June 1873, and was repealed by the Statute Law Revision Act 1883.

1874
The Consolidated Fund (£1,422,797 14s. 6d.) Act (37 & 38 Vict c 1) is sometimes called the Supply Act 1874. The Bill for this Act was the Consolidated Fund (£1,422,797 14s. 6d.) Bill. This Act received royal assent on 28 March 1874, and was repealed by the Statute Law Revision Act 1883.
The Consolidated Fund (£7,000,000) Act (37 & 38 Vict c 2) is sometimes called the Supply Act 1874. The Bill for this Act was the Consolidated Fund (£7,000,000) Bill. This Act received royal assent on 30 March 1874, and was repealed by the Statute Law Revision Act 1883.
The Consolidated Fund (£13,000,000) Act (37 & 38 Vict c 10). The Bill for this Act was the Consolidated Fund (£13,000,000) Bill. This Act received royal assent on 21 May 1874, and was repealed by the Statute Law Revision Act 1883.

1875
The Consolidated Fund Act (38 & 39 Vict c 1). The Bill for this Act was the Consolidated Fund {£880,522 1s. 4d. £2,139 7s. 7d.} Bill. This Act received royal assent on 19 March 1875, and was repealed by the Statute Law Revision Act 1883.
The Consolidated Fund Act (38 & 39 Vict c 2). The Bill for this Act was the Consolidated Fund (£7,000,000) Bill. This Act received royal assent on 19 March 1875, and was repealed by the Statute Law Revision Act 1883.
The Consolidated Fund Act (38 & 39 Vict c 10). The Bill for this Act was the Consolidated Fund (£15,000,000) Bill. This Act received royal assent on 13 May 1875, and was repealed by the Statute Law Revision Act 1883.

1876
The Consolidated Fund Act (4,080,000l.) (39 & 40 Vict c 2). The Bill for this Act was the Consolidated Fund (£4,080,000) Bill. This Act received royal assent on 9 March 1876, and was repealed by the Statute Law Revision Act 1883.
The Consolidated Fund Act (10,029,550l. 5s. 1d.) (39 & 40 Vict c 4) is sometimes called the Supply Act 1876. The Bill for this Act was the Consolidated Fund (£10,029,550 5s. 1d.) Bill. This Act received royal assent on 27 March 1876, and was repealed by the Statute Law Revision Act 1883.
The Consolidated Fund Act (11,000,000l.) (39 & 40 Vict c 15) is sometimes called the Supply Act 1876. The Bill for this Act was the Consolidated Fund (£11,000,000) Bill. This Act received royal assent on 1 June 1876, and was repealed by the Statute Law Revision Act 1883.

1877
The Consolidated Fund Act (350,000l.) (40 & 41 Vict c 1). The Bill for this Act was the Consolidated Fund (£350,000) Bill. This Act received royal assent on 12 March 1877, and was repealed by the Statute Law Revision Act 1883.
The Act 40 & 41 Vict c 6. The Bill for this Act was the Consolidated Fund (£9,641,960 6s. 9d.) Bill. This Act received royal assent on 27 March 1877, and was repealed by the Statute Law Revision Act 1883.
The Consolidated Fund (5,900,000l.) Act (40 & 41 Vict c 12). The Bill for this Act was the Consolidated Fund (£5,900,000) Bill. This Act received royal assent on 11 June 1877, and was repealed by the Statute Law Revision Act 1883.
The Consolidated Fund (20,000,000l.) Act (40 & 41 Vict c 24) is sometimes called the Supply Act 1877. The Bill for this Act was the Consolidated Fund (£20,000,000) Bill. This Act received royal assent on 23 July 1877, and was repealed by the Statute Law Revision Act 1883.

1878
The Consolidated Fund Act (6,000,000l.) (41 & 42 Vict c 1). The Bill for this Act was the Consolidated Fund (£6,000,000) Bill. This Act received royal assent on 28 February 1878, and was repealed by the Statute Law Revision Act 1883.
The Consolidated Fund (No. 2) Act 1878 (41 & 42 Vict c 9). This Act received royal assent on 28 March 1878, and was repealed by the Statute Law Revision Act 1883.
The Consolidated Fund (No. 3) Act 1878 (41 & 42 Vict c 21). This Act received royal assent on 17 June 1878, and was repealed by the Statute Law Revision Act 1883.
The Consolidated Fund (No. 4) Act 1878 (41 & 42 Vict c 45). This Act received royal assent on 8 August 1878, and was repealed by the Statute Law Revision Act 1883.

1879
The Consolidated Fund (No. 1) Act 1879 (42 & 43 Vict c 2) is sometimes called the Consolidated Fund Act (4,250,000l.). This Act received royal assent on 14 March 1879, and was repealed by the First Schedule to the Statute Law Revision Act 1894.
The Consolidated Fund (No. 2) Act 1879 (42 & 43 Vict c 7). This Act received royal assent on 28 March 1879, and was repealed by the First Schedule to the Statute Law Revision Act 1894.
The Consolidated Fund (No. 3) Act 1879 (42 & 43 Vict c 14). This Act received royal assent on 27 May 1879, and was repealed by the First Schedule to the Statute Law Revision Act 1894.
The Consolidated Fund (No. 4) Act 1879 (42 & 43 Vict c 20). This Act received royal assent on 3 July 1879, and was repealed by the First Schedule to the Statute Law Revision Act 1894.

1880
The Consolidated Fund (No. 1) Act 1880 (43 Vict c 5). This Act received royal assent on 15 March 1880, and was repealed by the First Schedule to the Statute Law Revision Act 1894.
The Consolidated Fund (No. 1) Act 1880 (Session 2) (43 & 44 Vict c 3). This Act received royal assent on 29 June 1880, and was repealed by the First Schedule to the Statute Law Revision Act 1894.
The Consolidated Fund (No. 2) Act 1880 (Session 2) (43 & 44 Vict c 30). This Act received royal assent on 26 August 1880, and was repealed by the First Schedule to the Statute Law Revision Act 1894.

1881
The Consolidated Fund (No. 1) Act 1881 (44 & 45 Vict c 1). This Act received royal assent on 17 February 1881, and was repealed by the First Schedule to the Statute Law Revision Act 1894.
The Consolidated Fund (No. 2) Act 1881 (44 & 45 Vict c 8). This Act received royal assent on 29 March 1881, and was repealed by the First Schedule to the Statute Law Revision Act 1894.
The Consolidated Fund (No. 3) Act 1881 (44 & 45 Vict c 15). This Act received royal assent on 27 June 1881, and was repealed by the First Schedule to the Statute Law Revision Act 1894.
The Consolidated Fund (No. 4) Act 1881 (44 & 45 Vict c 50). This Act received royal assent on 22 August 1881, and was repealed by the First Schedule to the Statute Law Revision Act 1894.

1882–1959

From 1960
Consolidated  Fund Act 1960 (8 & 9 Eliz 2 c 10)
Consolidated Fund Act 1961 (9 & 10 Eliz 2 c 7)
Consolidated  Fund (No. 2) Act 1961 (9 & 10 Eliz 2 c 12)
Consolidated Fund Act 1962 (10 & 11 Eliz 2 c 7)
Consolidated Fund (No. 2) Act 1962 (10 & 11 Eliz 2 c 11)
Consolidated Fund Act 1963 (c 1)
Consolidated Fund (No. 2) Act 1963 (c 8)
Consolidated Fund Act 1964 (c 1)
Consolidated Fund (No. 2) Act 1964 (c 17)
Consolidated Fund Act 1965 (c 1)
Consolidated Fund (No. 2) Act 1965 (c 8)
Consolidated Fund Act 1966 (c 1)
Consolidated Fund Act 1967 (c 2)
Consolidated Fund (No. 2) Act 1967 (c 6)
Consolidated Fund Act 1968 (c 1)
Consolidated Fund (No. 2) Act 1968 (c 15)
Consolidated Fund Act 1969 (c 3)
Consolidated Fund (No. 2) Act 1969 (c 9)
Consolidated Fund Act 1970 (c 1)
Consolidated Fund (No. 2) Act 1970 (c 12)
Consolidated Fund Act 1971 (c 1)
Consolidated Fund (No. 2) Act 1971 (c 14)
Consolidated Fund (No. 3) Act 1971 (c 79)
Consolidated Fund Act 1972 (c 13)
Consolidated Fund (No. 2) Act 1972 (c 23)
Consolidated Fund (No. 3) Act 1972 (c 78)
Consolidated Fund Act 1973 (c 1)
Consolidated Fund (No. 2) Act 1973 (c 10)
Consolidated Fund Act 1974 (c 1)
Consolidated Fund (No. 2) Act 1974 (c 12)
Consolidated Fund (No. 3) Act 1974 (c 15)
Consolidated Fund (No. 4) Act 1974 (c 57)
Consolidated Fund Act 1975 (c 1)
Consolidated Fund (No. 2) Act 1975 (c 12)
Consolidated Fund (No. 3) Act 1975 (c 79)
Consolidated Fund Act 1976 (c 2)
Consolidated Fund (No. 2) Act 1976 (c 84)
Consolidated Fund Act 1977 (c 1)
Consolidated Fund (No. 2) Act 1977 (c 52)
Consolidated Fund Act 1978 (c 7)
Consolidated Fund (No. 2) Act 1978 (c 59)
Consolidated Fund Act 1979 (c 20)
Consolidated Fund (No. 2) Act 1979 (c 56)
Consolidated Fund Act 1980 (c 14)
Consolidated Fund (No. 2) Act 1980 (c 68)
Consolidated Fund Act 1981 (c 4)
Consolidated Fund (No. 2) Act 1981 (c 70)
Consolidated Fund Act 1982 (c 8)
Consolidated Fund Act 1983 (c 1)
Consolidated Fund (No. 2) Act 1983 (c 5)
Consolidated Fund (No. 3) Act 1983 (c 57)
Consolidated Fund Act 1984 (c 1)
Consolidated Fund (No. 2) Act 1984 (c 61)
Consolidated Fund Act 1985 (c 1)
Consolidated Fund (No. 2) Act 1985 (c 11)
Consolidated Fund (No. 3) Act 1985 (c 74)
Consolidated Fund Act 1986 (c 4)
Consolidated Fund (No. 2) Act 1986 (c 67)
Consolidated Fund Act 1987 (c 8)
Consolidated Fund (No. 2) Act 1987 (c 54)
Consolidated Fund (No. 3) Act 1987 (c 55)
Consolidated Fund Act 1988 (c 6)
Consolidated Fund (No. 2) Act 1988 (c 55)
Consolidated Fund Act 1989 (c 2)
Consolidated Fund (No. 2) Act 1989 (c 46)
Consolidated Fund Act 1990 (c 4)
Consolidated Fund (No. 2) Act 1990 (c 46)
Consolidated Fund Act 1991 (c 7)
Consolidated Fund (No. 2) Act 1991 (c 10)
Consolidated Fund (No. 3) Act 1991 (c 68)
Consolidated Fund Act 1992 (c 1)
Consolidated Fund (No. 2) Act 1992 (c 21)
Consolidated Fund (No. 3) Act 1992 (c 59)
Consolidated Fund Act 1993 (c 4)
Consolidated Fund (No. 2) Act 1993 (c 7)
Consolidated Fund (No. 3) Act 1993 (c 52)
Consolidated Fund Act 1994 (c 4)
Consolidated Fund (No. 2) Act 1994 (c 41)
Consolidated Fund Act 1995 (c 2)
Consolidated Fund (No. 2) Act 1995 (c 54)
Consolidated Fund Act 1996 (c 4)
Consolidated Fund (No. 2) Act 1996 (c 60)
Consolidated Fund Act 1997 (c 15)
Consolidated Fund (No. 2) Act 1997 (c 67)
Consolidated Fund Act 1998 (c 4)
Consolidated Fund (No. 2) Act 1998 (c 49)
Consolidated Fund Act 1999 (c 4)
Consolidated Fund (No. 2) Act 1999 (c 35)
Consolidated Fund Act 2000 (c 3)
Consolidated Fund (No. 2) Act 2000 (c 45)
Consolidated Fund Act 2001 (c 1)
Consolidated Fund (No. 2) Act 2001 (c 25)
Consolidated Fund Act 2002 (c 10)
Consolidated Fund (No. 2) Act 2002 (c 43)
Consolidated Fund Act 2003 (c 2)
Consolidated Fund (No. 2) Act 2003 (c 45)
Consolidated Fund Act 2004 (c 1)
Consolidated Fund (No. 2) Act 2004 (c 38)
Consolidated Fund Act 2005 (c 23)
Consolidated Fund Act 2006 (c 54)
Consolidated Fund Act 2007 (c 31)
Consolidated Fund Act 2008 (c 33)
Consolidated Fund Act 2009 (c 27)
Consolidated Fund Act 2010 (c 39)

No Consolidated Fund Acts have been passed since 2010.

Consolidated Fund (Permanent Charges Redemption) Acts
The Consolidated Fund (Permanent Charges Redemption) Acts 1873 and 1883 was the collective title of the Consolidated Fund (Permanent Charges Redemption) Act 1873 (36 & 37 Vict c 57) and the Consolidated Fund (Permanent Charges Redemption) Act 1883 (46 & 47 Vict c 1).

Northern Ireland
The Consolidated Fund Measure (Northern Ireland) 1974 (c 1 (NI)) was a Measure of the Northern Ireland Assembly. See further section 5(1) of the Appropriation (Northern Ireland) Order 1974 (SI 1974/1266) (NI 1).

References

Bibliography

Norman Wilding and Philip Laundy. "Consolidated Fund Acts". An Encyclopaedia of Parliament. Third Edition. Frederick A Praeger. New York and Washington. 1968. Pages 167 and 168. See also pages 24, 25, 255, 264, 536 and 596.
Will Bateman. Public Finance and Parliamentary Constitutionalism. Cambridge University Press. 2020. Page 30 et seq.
Edward Hamilton, "Ways and Means Advances", 1893, reproduced in Wormell (ed). National Debt in Britain, 1850-1930. Routledge. 1999. Volume 6. Pages 117 & 118 to 121. See also pages 83 and 202.

External links

Acts of the Parliament of the United Kingdom
Acts of the Parliament of Great Britain
United Kingdom public law
Public finance of the United Kingdom